Koo Wee Rup North is a bounded rural locality in Victoria, Australia,  south-east of Melbourne's central business district, located within the Shire of Cardinia local government area. Koo Wee Rup North recorded a population of 47 at the 2021 census.

History

Koo-Wee-Rup South Post Office opened around 1902, was renamed Koo-Wee-Rup North in 1921 and closed in 1974.

References

Shire of Cardinia